Dawa Thondup (also Da Thondup) was a Sherpa mountaineer. He had been a porter on the 1933 British Mount Everest expedition, he survived the 1934 Nanga Parbat climbing disaster, and he was a team member on a 1935 expedition led by James Waller and John Hunt to Saltoro Kangri. In 1937, he was with Hunt again, during an expedition in the Kanchenjunga area. The next year, he was part of a group led by James Waller that attempted to climb Masherbrum. Thondup was a "first-class porter" on that expedition; with Waller, he reached Camp 6, at 23,500 feet, and had been picked for the second summit team, but the first team returned because of bad weather and all climbers descended.

Thondup participated in the disastrous 1939 American Karakoram expedition to K2. He may have been part of the English-Swiss expedition in 1950 that was the first to summit Abi Gamin. He also participated in 1953 British Mount Everest expedition led by Col. John Hunt.

References

Indian mountain climbers
Indian summiters of Mount Everest